Mohammad Khorrami may refer to:
 Mohammad Khorrami (physicist)
 Mohammad Khorrami (wrestler)